Doomsday for the Deceiver is the debut album by Flotsam and Jetsam. It was released on July 4, 1986, on a budget of $12,000, and recorded in two weeks. It is the only album by Flotsam and Jetsam with Jason Newsted before his departure for Metallica. Most lyrics were written by Newsted; his songwriting contributions also appeared on the band's next album No Place for Disgrace (1988) and their 2012 album Ugly Noise.

Overview
While most of their later albums focused more on politics and society in general, the lyrical content of Doomsday for the Deceiver is centered around themes related to history and literature, as well as Satanism and the occult. "She Took an Axe" relates the story of Lizzie Borden, who had been suspected of murdering her parents in 1892, and has a jump-rope rhyme written about her at the time as a refrain. "Der Fuhrer" refers to Adolf Hitler; the lyrics are more or less a story about him, in which he is portrayed as being evil and a "demon", but were not meant to be sympathetic towards Hitler or the Nazi Party.

The album was re-released in 2006, including a re-mixed and re-mastered version, DVD, and original release. This album was the first of only a handful to ever receive a 6K rating from the influential British magazine Kerrang!. The album cover can be seen in the 1988 movie Sleepaway Camp II: Unhappy Campers.

Reception and awards
Doomsday for the Deceiver was ranked at number six on Loudwire'''s top ten list of "Thrash Albums NOT Released by the Big 4". Doomsday was also inducted into Decibel Magazine''’s Hall of Fame in 2021.

Track listing
All songs written by Kelly David-Smith, Edward Carlson, Eric A.K., Jason Newsted, Michael Gilbert. All lyrics by Jason Newsted except "Iron Tears" by Jason Newsted and Jennifer Lowe, "Metalshock" by Jason Newsted and Eric A.K., "U.L.S.W." by Jason Newsted and Edward Carlson. 

20th-anniversary special edition bonus tracks

Credits

Band
Eric A.K. Knutson - lead vocals
Edward Carlson - guitars, backing vocals
Michael Gilbert - guitars, backing vocals
Jason Newsted - bass, backing vocals
Kelly David-Smith - drums, backing vocals

Other 
Brian Slagel - producing
Flotsam and Jetsam - producing, arrangements
Bill Metoyer - engineering
Mastered at Capitol Mastering
Kevin Tyler - cover art

References

1986 debut albums
Flotsam and Jetsam (band) albums
Metal Blade Records albums